Staub Memorial Congregational Church, also known as Community Bible Fellowship and Sunnyside Congregational Church, is a church located in southeast Portland, Oregon.

In 2011, Mars Hill Church bought the building and announced it would start a Portland congregation there. Controversy ensued due to perceptions that the church may be at odds with Portland's gay community.

References

External links
 

Churches in Portland, Oregon
Mars Hill Church buildings